A381 may refer to:

 The A381 road in Devon, England
 The Autovía A-381, a motorway in Andalucia, Spain
 The RMAS Cricklade (A381), a fleet tender to the United Kingdom's Royal Navy